The Benelux Racing League Light is a race-class that is mostly run in Belgium and The Netherlands. It serves as the development series of the BRL V6.

The car
All the cars in the series are the same. They use the body and a tubular chassis of a Ford Focus. The engine is a 240hp, 2.3L Ford Duratec. The cars have rearwheel drive. The weight of the car is 825kg. The series uses Dunlop slicks.

Champions

References

External links
  Official Website
  BRL Light on Autosport.nl
  BRL Website

Touring car racing series
Auto racing series in Belgium
Auto racing series in the Netherlands